Charles Mackie (1882 – ?) was a Scottish footballer who played as a forward. Born in Peterhead, he played for Aberdeen, where he had two spells, and in England with Manchester United of the English Football League and West Ham United of the Southern League.

References

External links
MUFCInfo.com profile

1882 births
Year of death missing
People from Peterhead
Scottish footballers
Peterhead F.C. players
Manchester United F.C. players
Aberdeen F.C. players
West Ham United F.C. players
Lochgelly United F.C. players
Association football forwards
English Football League players
Southern Football League players
Footballers from Aberdeenshire